The 1987 African U-16 Qualifying for World Cup was a qualifying edition organized by the Confederation of African Football (CAF) into the FIFA U-16 World Championship. The three winners qualified to the 1987 FIFA U-16 World Championship.

First round
The Côte d'Ivoire-Togo matches were played on 22 June 1986 and 5 July 1986. The winners advanced to the Second Round.

|}

Ivory Coast qualified on penalties freekick 4–3 after a draw of 2–2 on aggregate.

Lesotho qualified after the withdrawal of Mauritius.

Ethiopia qualified after the withdrawal of Sudan.

Cameroon qualified after the withdrawal of Gabon.

Ghana qualified after the withdrawal of Benin.

Liberia qualified after the withdrawal of Gambia.

Second round
The first leg matches were played on either the 09th or 10 August 1986. The second leg matches were played on either the 22nd, 23rd or 24 August 1986. The Liberia vs Guinea matches were played on 1st and 15 November 1986. The winners advanced to the Third Round.

|}

Nigeria advanced on away goal after 1−1 on aggregate.

Algeria advanced after 1−0 on aggregate.

Ivory Coast advanced on away goal after 3−3 on aggregate.

Guinea advanced after 2−1 on aggregate.

Egypt qualified after the withdrawal of Ethiopia in the second leg.

Zambia qualified after the withdrawal of Lesotho.

Third round
The first leg matches were played on either the 2nd or 4 January 1987. The second leg matches were played on either the 16th or 18 January 1987. The winners qualified for the 1987 FIFA U-16 World Championship.

|}

Egypt qualified after 2−1 on aggregate.

Ivory Coast qualified after 3−1 on aggregate.

Nigeria qualified after the withdrawal of Zambia

Countries to participate in 1987 FIFA U-16 World Championship
The 3 teams which qualified for 1987 FIFA U-16 World Championship.

External links
Details qualifying - rsssf.com

1987 in African football
African U-16 Qualifying for World Cup